Majok Maker Majok (born 10 December 1992) is a South Sudanese-Australian professional basketball player for the Perth Wildcats of the National Basketball League (NBL). He played college basketball for the Ball State Cardinals for two years, leading the Mid-American Conference (MAC) in rebounding and earning third-team all-conference honors in both seasons.

Early life and career
Majok was born in Rumbek, South Sudan, and moved to Australia when he was eight. His family settled in Perth. He initially played soccer before developing a liking for basketball in high school at Kingsway Christian College. In 2007 and 2008, he played in the State Basketball League (SBL) for the East Perth Eagles and Kalamunda Eastern Suns respectively.

After drawing interest from overseas scouts, Majok moved to the United States and played two years of high school ball at Northfield Mount Hermon School in Massachusetts.

College career
Majok played two seasons in junior college at Midland College in Texas before transferring to Ball State University in Indiana. He played two seasons for the Cardinals, leading the MAC in rebounding and earning third-team all-conference honors in both years.  As a senior in 2013–14, he averaged 11.2 points and 10 rebounds per game to become the first Ball State player to average a double-double in a season since Theron Smith in 2001–02.

Professional career
After college, Majok moved to Slovenia and joined Helios Suns for the 2014–15 season. In 32 games, he averaged 6.9 points and 6.2 rebounds per game.

After feeling homesick, Majok returned to Australia and signed with Melbourne United of the National Basketball League on 9 July 2015. He helped Melbourne win the minor premiership in 2015–16 with a league-best 18–10 record while averaging 5.5 points and 7.1 rebounds per game. He averaged 5.7 points and 5.9 rebounds in 2016–17.

On 21 April 2017, Majok re-signed with United for the 2017–18 NBL season. During the offseason, he participated in a mini-camp with the Dallas Mavericks before their 2017 NBA Summer League. In March 2018, he was a member of United's championship-winning team. Injuries restricted much of his season, and in 22 games, he averaged 2.7 points and 2.7 rebounds per game.

On 16 April 2018, Majok signed with the Wellington Saints for the 2018 New Zealand NBL season.

On 4 May 2018, Majok signed a one-year deal with the New Zealand Breakers.

On 10 March 2019, Majok signed with the Frankston Blues for the 2019 NBL1 season.

On 8 July 2019, Majok signed a two-year deal with the Perth Wildcats. In March 2020, he was crowned an NBL champion for the second time in his career. In June 2020, the Wildcats exercised the club option on Majok's contract to retain him for the 2020–21 season. However, in November 2020, he was ruled out for the season after suffering an Achilles tendon injury at team training. In March 2021, the Wildcats won the mid-season NBL Cup.

On 6 July 2021, Majok re-signed with the Wildcats on a two-year deal. He averaged 5.3 points and 5.2 rebounds in 28 games during the 2021–22 NBL season. He joined the Warwick Senators of the NBL1 West in July 2022.

National team career
In June 2017, Majok was named in a 20-man Australian national team squad ahead of the 2017 FIBA Asia Cup.

References

External links

NBL profile
Melbourne United bio
Ball State bio
"Out Of Africa" at scout.com

1992 births
Living people
Ball State Cardinals men's basketball players
Centers (basketball)
Melbourne United players
New Zealand Breakers players
Perth Wildcats players
Power forwards (basketball)
South Sudanese men's basketball players
South Sudanese emigrants to Australia
Wellington Saints players
Helios Suns players
Australian men's basketball players
Basketball players from Perth, Western Australia
Australian expatriate basketball people in the United States
South Sudanese expatriate basketball people in the United States
Australian expatriate basketball people in Slovenia
Dinka people
South Sudanese expatriate basketball people in New Zealand
Australian expatriate basketball people in New Zealand